MS Azamara Onward, formerly R Three and Pacific Princess, is a cruise ship owned and operated by Azamara Cruises since 2022. She was built in 1999 by the Chantiers de l'Atlantique shipyard in Saint-Nazaire, France for Renaissance Cruises. In 2002, following the failure of Renaissance Cruises, the ship was sold to Princess Cruises and renamed Pacific Princess. On 21 January 2021, Carnival announced the ship had been sold to an unnamed buyer, later revealed to be Azamara Cruises.

Construction and career

R Three 
The vessel first entered operation in 1999, with Renaissance Cruises. The ship was not owned by the company, with possession instead residing with a group of French investors, who leased the ship to the company. In late 2001, the entire Renaissance fleet was seized by creditors.

Pacific Princess 
In late 2002, Princess Cruises chartered the R Three, along with sister ship R Four (previously  and now ). Both vessels entered operation by the end of 2002. The charter terminated at the end of 2004, at which time, both vessels were purchased by Princess Cruises. Gabi Hollows renamed the ship  Pacific Princess in Sydney on 8 December 2002, named after the earlier Pacific Princess which served as the ship featured in the television series, The Love Boat.

From 2002 to 2007 Pacific Princess was operated by P&O Cruises Australia from November to April every year. While From May to October she would be operated by Princess. This agreement was maintain until 2007 when Regal Princess was transferred to P&O and became Pacific Dawn.

The ship was the subject of a state aid decision by the European Commission: Decision 2006/219, in which the European Commission held a discussion on R Three and R Four, regarding the two ships' original purpose of intending to support local tourism in French Polynesia, and whether or not the re-deployments of the two ships beyond the French Polynesia region were a misuse of Commission-provided development aid. The conclusion presides that France unlawfully breached the treaty that governed the regulations surrounding development aid when the ships were redeployed outside of the local region, but with the devastating economic effects (force majeure) of the September 11 attacks and the fact that the expectations of local development impact have now otherwise been met, the ships' re-deployments were allowed and the development aid given to France was still rendered lawfully used.

Pacific Princess has often been deployed on itineraries servicing more exotic locales or ports within areas unreachable by larger vessels. These itineraries have included the World Cruise itineraries of more than 100 days. As of October 2019, Pacific Princess is operating voyages within the Mediterranean before embarking on the 2020 World Cruise. She was scheduled to return to Alaska in the summer of 2020, sailing between Vancouver and Whittier, before returning to the South Pacific for itineraries serving French Polynesia and Oceania.

In January 2021 Carnival announced the sale of the ship.

Incidents 

On 14 October 2016, Pacific Princess collided with the breakwater at Nice, Alpes-Maritimes, France and was holed below the waterline. There were no injuries amongst the 669 passengers and 382 crew.

Coronavirus quarantine 
During the COVID-19 pandemic in 2020, Pacific Princess was refused permission to dock at numerous destinations including Bali, Singapore, Phuket, Thailand, and Sri Lanka, even though there were no confirmed cases on board.  The ship was allowed to dock in Perth, Australia on 21 March and most passengers disembarked. Those who were unable to fly home remained on the ship which was heading to Los Angeles. The company stated that 115 passengers were still on board and that they had no confirmed cases of COVID-19. On 13 April 2020, 4 passengers were allowed to disembark in Honolulu, Hawaii. The last passengers disembarked when the ship returned to Los Angeles on 20 April.

References

Notes

Bibliography

External links

 Official website
 Pictures of Pacific Princess Cruise ship in port of Yalta, Ukraine

Ships of Princess Cruises
Ships built in France
1999 ships
Merchant ships of Liberia
Passenger ships of Liberia
Merchant ships of Gibraltar
Passenger ships of Gibraltar
Merchant ships of Bermuda
Passenger ships of Bermuda